Myrciaria silveirana is a species of plant in the family Myrtaceae. It is endemic to Brazil.

Taxonomy
Myrciaria silveirana was first described by  C. M. D. E. Legrand in 1977. It has been regarded as a synonym of Myrcia guianensis, but its description and type do not match the clade to which M. guianensis belongs. , the World Checklist of Selected Plant Families regards it as an unplaced name.

References

Endemic flora of Brazil
silveirana
Vulnerable plants
Taxonomy articles created by Polbot